A general election was held in the U.S. state of Wyoming on Tuesday, November 7, 1922. All of the state's executive officers—the Governor, Secretary of State, Auditor, Treasurer, and Superintendent of Public Instruction—were up for election. Democrats improved considerably from their performances in 1918, with William B. Ross winning the gubernatorial election and almost all of their statewide candidates outpacing their 1918 nominees. However, Republicans held all of the other statewide offices.

Governor

Incumbent Republican Governor Robert D. Carey ran for re-election to a second term. However, he was defeated in the Republican primary by banker Frank Hay. In the general election, William B. Ross, the Democratic nominee and the former Laramie County Attorney, narrowly defeated Hay. However, Ross would not serve a full term as Governor; he died on October 2, 1924, triggering a special election the next month, which his wife, Nellie Tayloe Ross, won.

Secretary of State
Incumbent Republican Secretary of State William E. Chaplin opted to not seek re-election, and instead managed Congressman Frank W. Mondell's unsuccessful campaign for the U.S. Senate. A crowded Republican primary developed to replace him, with State Senator Frank E. Lucas, L. Curtis Hinkle, and State Treasurer A. D. Hoskins all running. The primary was quite close, and Lucas was not declared the winner over Hinkle for several weeks. In the general election, Lucas faced Cheyenne Mayor Edwin P. Taylor, the Democratic nominee. Following a close campaign, Lucas narrowly defeated Taylor to win election as Secretary of State. During Lucas's term, Governor Ross would die in office, temporarily (and briefly) elevating Lucas to the governorship.

Democratic primary

Candidates
 Edwin P. Taylor, Mayor of Cheyenne

Results

Republican primary

Candidates
 Frank E. Lucas, State Senator from Johnson County
 L. Curtis Hinkle, Deputy Secretary of State, former State Representative from Laramie County
 A. D. Hoskins, Wyoming State Treasurer

Results

General election

Results

Auditor
Incumbent State Auditor I. C. Jefferis, a Republican first elected in 1918, ran for re-election to a second term. He faced a strong challenge in the Republican primary from Deputy Attorney General Vincent Carter, and narrowly lost renomination to Carter. In the general election, he faced G. H. Little, the Democratic nominee, and defeated him by a narrow margin to win his first of two terms as State Auditor.

Democratic primary

Candidates
 G. H. Little

Results

Republican primary

Candidates
 Vincent Carter, Deputy State Attorney General
 I. C. Jefferis, incumbent State Auditor

Results

General election

Results

Treasurer
Incumbent Republican State Treasurer A. D. Hoskins was unable to seek re-election due to term limits, and instead waged an unsuccessful campaign for Secretary of State. State Highway Commissioner John M. Snyder emerged as the Republican nominee, and faced former Sheridan City Commissioner Harry A. Loucks in the general election. Snyder, like most other statewide Republican candidates, ended up narrowly defeating Loucks.

Democratic primary

Candidates
 Harry A. Loucks, former Sheridan City Commissioner

Results

Republican primary

Candidates
 John M. Snyder, State Highway Commissioner
 Jesse Crosby

Results

General election

Results

Superintendent of Public Instruction
Incumbent Republican Superintendent of Public Instruction Katharine A. Morton ran for re-election to a second term. She was challenged in the Republican primary by Mrs. Cyrus Beard, the former Superintendent of Schools for the city of Evanston. Morton defeated Beard by a wide margin and advanced to the general election, where she was opposed by the Democratic nominee, teacher Cecilia H. Hendricks. Unlike every other Republican candidate, Morton won her race in a landslide, improving on her performance from 1918.

Democratic primary

Candidates
 Cecilia H. Hendricks, teacher

Results

Republican primary

Candidates
 Katharine A. Morton, incumbent Superintendent of Instruction
 Mrs. Cyrus Beard, former Superintendent of Evanston Schools

Results

General election

Results

References

 
Wyoming